Asbjørn is a Norwegian and Danish male given name. In 2013, there were more than 7,000 men in Norway with this name. In Norway it reached the peak of its popularity between 1910 and 1930, during which period approximately 1% of children were given the name.

The name is a combination of the words as, i.e. a god in the Norse pantheon, and bjørn, meaning bear. (Bjørn can also be used as a given name by itself.)

Variants
Variants include Espen and Esben. In Swedish, the equivalent is Esbjörn.

The English surnames Osborn, Osborne, Osbourne and Usborne come from Asbjørn or the same route.

Notable people

Asbjørn
 Asbjørn Andersen (1903–1978), Danish actor 
 Asbjørn Halvorsen (1898–1955), Norwegian footballer
 Asbjørn Hansen (1930–2017), Norwegian footballer
 Asbjørn Haugstvedt (1926–2008), Norwegian politician
 Asbjørn Lindboe (1889–1967), Norwegian politician
 Asbjørn Ruud (1919–1989), Norwegian ski jumper
 Asbjørn Sennels (born 1979), Danish footballer
 Asbjørn Sunde (1909–1985), Norwegian sailor
 Asbjørn Tenden (born 1975), Norwegian footballer
 Asbjørn Wahl (born 1951), Norwegian researcher and author

Ásbjǫrn
Ásbjǫrn skerjablesi (died 874), ruler of the Hebrides

References

Danish masculine given names
Norwegian masculine given names
Scandinavian masculine given names